Mount Sinha is a mountain (990 m) at the southeast extremity of Erickson Bluffs in the south part of McDonald Heights. It overlooks the lower Kirkpatrick Glacier from the north in Marie Byrd Land. Mapped by the United States Geological Survey (USGS) from surveys and U.S. Navy air photos, 1959–65. Named by Advisory Committee on Antarctic Names (US-ACAN) for Akhouri Sinha, a member of the biological party that made population studies of seals, whales, and birds in the pack ice of the Bellingshausen and Amundsen Seas using USCGC Southwind and its two helicopters, 1971–72.

See also
Mount Petrides

References

Mountains of Marie Byrd Land